Air Chief Marshal Kaset Rojananil (born 27 August 1933) is a Thai retired air force officer. He was the Commander of the Royal Thai Air Force from 1989 to 1992 and briefly held Thailand's most senior military post, the Supreme Commander of the Royal Thai Armed Forces from  April to July 1992.

Kaset was an alumnus of the 5th Class of the Chulachomklao Royal Military Academy, and one of the leaders of the National Peace Keeping Council's 1991 coup against the government of Chatichai Choonhavan. After the coup he became head of Thai Airways International, and co-founded of the pro-military Justice Unity Party. He was later demoted to general inspector of the Ministry of Defense.

As head of Thai Airways International, he famously noted that "we have received a lot of complaints that our air hostesses are not pretty enough—too old and unsmiling. And we must improve on that". He added that the airline had been hiring too many college-educated women and that "intelligent women tend to not be good looking." He noted that he had ordered airline recruiters to screen flight attendant applications "in the way beauty-pageant judging panels select contestants."

References

Further reading
 Interview with Kaset Rojananil, Manager Daily, 27 January 1993

Living people
1933 births
Kaset Rojananil
Kaset Rojananil
Kaset Rojananil
Kaset Rojananil
Kaset Rojananil
Kaset Rojananil